The Seminary of SS Peter and Paul is a Roman Catholic Seminary in Dili, East Timor. It is the country’s only Major Seminary named after the Saints Peter and Paul. It is located in Fatumeta.

The seminary was jointly established in 2000 by Bishop Carlos Filipe Ximenes Belo and Bishop Basílio do Nascimento.

The first group of 17 seminarians was ordained in 2006. In 2007 there were 15 ordinations and 4 in 2008.

All Church properties are seen as sanctuaries in East Timor. In 2006 camps for Internally Displaced People occupied by thousands of East Timorese families who fled their homes in the civil strife which broke out in April–May, were located in or around Dili, including the Seminary.

However, the Church is not immune to violence. On June 27, 2006, during the East Timorese crisis, anti-Alkatiri demonstrators threw rocks at the seminary, destroying toilets set up by the UN for refugees sheltering in the seminary.

Now Carmelite students in East Timor who are preparing for the priesthood no longer need to travel to Indonesia, but can study at the Diocesan seminary at Fatumeta. They now study the Portuguese language and take their seminary classes in Portuguese and Tetum.

The seminary has grown to the extent that the first year students, the largest group, have to use the dining hall and recreation room for their studies. In 2010 there were 85 seminarians.
In 2020 this had grown to 150 students which was expected to increase to 190 students in 2021.
In 2018,  Father Martinho Gusmao was rector of the Seminary. In 2019 he had been replaced by Father Eduardo de Almeida.

Prominent Rectors
Fr. Alberto Ricardo da Silva rector of the major seminary was named bishop of Dili in 2004.

Fr. Norberto do Amaral who was Professor of Dogmatic Theology and Prefect of Studies at the Major Seminary from 2007-2008 was appointed as the first Bishop of Maliana.

References

Catholic seminaries
Catholic Church in East Timor
Dili